is a retired Japanese admiral who served as the 32nd Chief of Staff, Japan Maritime Self-Defense Force. Born in the Japanese prefecture of Nagano, Takei was commissioned into the JMSDF in March 1979 following his graduation from the 23rd class of National Defense Academy. After 35 years of service, Takei assumed position of JMSDF Chief of Staff in 2014.

Major assignments

 March 1997:  Commanding Officer, JDS Ishikari (DE-226)
 August 1999: Division staff, Plans and Progrems Division, Operations and Plans Department, Maritime Staff Office
 December 1999: Section chief, Plans and Progrems Division
 April 2001: Commander, Escort Division 1
 September 2002: Division staff, System Programs Division, Operations and Plans Department, Maritime Staff Office
 December 2002: Director, System Programs Division
 August 30, 2004: Deputy Director General, Administration Department, Maritime Staff Office
 March 27, 2006: Director General, C4I Systems Department, Joint Staff Office
 September 1, 2007: Chief of Staff, Commandant Kure District 
 March 24, 2008: Director General, Operations and Plans Department, Maritime Staff Office
 July 26, 2010: Commandant, Ominato District
 August 5, 2011: Vice Chief of Staff, Japan Maritime Self-Defense Force
 July 26, 2010: Commandant, Yokosuka District
 October 14, 2014: Chief of Staff, Japan Maritime Self-Defense Force

Awards and honors
  – Legion of Merit

Dates of promotion

References

External links

Living people
Chiefs of Staff of the Japan Maritime Self-Defense Force
1957 births
Military personnel from Nagano Prefecture
National Defense Academy of Japan alumni
Recipients of the Legion of Merit
Naval War College faculty